The 2010–11 Surinamese Hoofdklasse is the 78th season of the Surinamese Hoofdklasse, the highest football league competition of Suriname. The season began on November 17, 2010 and will conclude on September 14, 2011. Inter Moengotapoe are the defending champions.

Changes from 2009–10
 FCS Nacional and Jai Hanuman were relegated to the Eerste Klasse.
 Excelsior and Kamal Dewaker were promoted to the Hoofdklasse
 The league will play a balanced schedule with 18 games; each team playing every other team twice: home and away. At the conclusion of this, the league will be split into two groups. The teams placed 1st through 6th will play a 10-game double round robin schedule for the championship and Suriname's CFU Club Championship spots, while the teams placed 7th through 10th will play a 6-game double round robin schedule for a direct relegation spot and a promotion/relegation playoff spot.

Personnel and sponsoring 

Note: Flags indicate national team as has been defined under FIFA eligibility rules. Players and Managers may hold more than one non-FIFA nationality.

Regular season

League table

Results

Positions by round

Second round

Championship group

Relegation group

Related Competitions

CFU Club Championship 

The 2009–10 Hoofdklasse champion and finalist were admitted into the subcontinental tournament, the 2011 CFU Club Championship. The two clubs were Inter Moengotapoe and Walking Bout Company respectively.

Inter was paired up against Guyanese champions, Milerock in the first round of the tournament. WBC faced off against the St. Lucian champions, Northern United All Stars. In the first round, Inter lost 3–2 on aggregate to Milerock,  while WBC defeated Northern United 6–1 on aggregate.

Upon defeat Northern United, WBC took on defending CFU champions, Puerto Rico Islanders, in the second elimination round of the tournament. The first leg opted to be in favor of WBC, as they took a 1–0 lead in the match. However, at the tail end of the match, the Islanders drew level with WBC. On May 14, WBC took on the Islanders in Bayamon, Puerto Rico, and ended their Champions League hopes with a 7–0 defeat. Still, WBC advanced the furthest in modern-day CONCACAF history to date.

CONCACAF Champions League 

WBC and Leo Victor came close to qualifying for the Champions League, but fell short in the second round. WBC and Inter Moengo could have qualified for the 2011–12 CONCACAF Champions League by finishing in the top three of the 2011 CFU Club Championship, however they did not do so.

References

External links 
 SVB Website

SVB Eerste Divisie seasons
1
Surinam